The persimmon  is the edible fruit of a number of species of trees in the genus Diospyros. The most widely cultivated of these is the Oriental persimmon, Diospyros kaki  Diospyros is in the family Ebenaceae, and a number of non-persimmon species of the genus are grown for ebony timber. In 2019, China produced 75% of the world total of persimmons.

Description 

Like the tomato, persimmons are not commonly considered to be berries, but morphologically the fruit is in fact a berry. The tree Diospyros kaki is the most widely cultivated species of persimmon. Typically the tree reaches  in height and is round-topped. It usually stands erect, but sometimes can be crooked or have a willowy appearance.
They are leathery and glossy on the upper surface, brown and silky underneath. The leaves are deciduous and bluish-green in color. In autumn, they turn to yellow, orange, or red.

Persimmon trees are typically dioecious, meaning male and female flowers are produced on separate trees. Some trees have both male and female flowers and in rare cases may bear a perfect flower, which contains both male and female reproductive organs in one flower. Male flowers are pink and appear in groups of 3. They have a 4-parted calyx, a corolla, and 24 stamens in 2 rows. Female flowers are creamy-white and appear singly. They have a large calyx, a 4-parted, yellow corolla, 8 undeveloped stamens, and a rounded ovary bearing the style and stigma. 'Perfect' flowers are a cross between the two.

Persimmon fruit matures late in the fall and can stay on the tree until winter. In color, the ripe fruit of the cultivated strains range from glossy light yellow-orange to dark red-orange depending on the species and variety. The flesh is astringent until fully ripe and is yellow, orange, or dark-brown in color. The calyx generally remains attached to the fruit after harvesting, but becomes easy to remove once the fruit is ripe. The ripe fruit is high in sucrose, mainly in the form of fructose and glucose content and is sweet in taste.

Chemistry 
Persimmon fruits contain phytochemicals, such as catechin, gallocatechin and betulinic acid.

Taxonomy

Selected species

While many species of Diospyros bear fruit inedible to humans or only occasionally gathered, the following are grown for their edible fruit:

Diospyros kaki (Oriental persimmon)
Oriental persimmon, Chinese persimmon or Japanese persimmon (Diospyros kaki) is the most commercially important persimmon. It is native to China, Northeast India and northern Indochina. It was first cultivated in China more than 2,000 years ago, and introduced to Japan in the 7th century and to Korea in the 14th century. China, Japan and South Korea are also the top producers of persimmon. It is known as shi (柿) in Chinese, kaki (柿) in Japanese and gam (감) in Korean and also known as Korean mango. It is known as haluwabed (हलुवाबेद) in Nepal and it is used for various culinary purposes and eaten as a seasonal fruit. In Nepal, it is one of the most popular fruits and has been consumed for a very long time. It was introduced to California and southern Europe in the 1800s and to Brazil in the 1890s, in the State of São Paulo, afterwards spreading across Brazil with Japanese immigrants; the State of São Paulo is still the greatest producer within Brazil, with an area of  dedicated to persimmon culture in 2003; It is deciduous, with broad, stiff leaves. Its fruits are sweet and slightly tangy with a soft to occasionally fibrous texture.

Varieties

Numerous cultivars have been selected. Some varieties are edible in the crisp, firm state but it has its best flavor when allowed to rest and soften slightly after harvest. The Japanese cultivar 'Hachiya' is widely grown. The fruit has a high tannin content, which makes the unripe fruit astringent and bitter. The tannin levels are reduced as the fruit matures. Persimmons like 'Hachiya' must be completely ripened before consumption. When ripe, this fruit comprises thick, pulpy jelly encased in a waxy thin-skinned shell.

Commercially and in general, there are two types of persimmon fruit: astringent and non-astringent.

The heart-shaped Hachiya is the most common variety of astringent persimmon. Astringent persimmons contain very high levels of soluble tannins and are unpalatable if eaten before completely softened. The astringency of tannins is removed in various ways. Examples include ripening by exposure to light for several days and wrapping the fruit in paper (probably because this increases the ethylene concentration of the surrounding air). Ethylene ripening can be increased in reliability and evenness, and the process can be greatly accelerated by adding ethylene gas to the atmosphere in which the fruit is stored. For domestic purposes, the most convenient and effective process is to store the ripening persimmons in a clean, dry container together with other varieties of fruit that give off particularly large quantities of ethylene while they are ripening; apples and related fruits such as pears are effective, and so are bananas and several others. Other chemicals are used commercially in artificially ripening persimmons or delaying their ripening. Examples include alcohol and carbon dioxide, which change tannin into the insoluble form. Such bletting processes sometimes are jump-started by exposing the fruit to cold or frost. The resultant cell damage stimulates the release of ethylene, which promotes cellular wall breakdown. Astringent varieties of persimmons also can be prepared for commercial purposes by drying. Tanenashi fruit will occasionally contain a seed or two, which can be planted and will yield a larger, more vertical tree than when merely grafted onto the D. virginiana rootstock most commonly used in the U.S. Such seedling trees may produce fruit that bears more seeds, usually 6 to 8 per fruit, and the fruit itself may vary slightly from the parent tree. Seedlings are said to be more susceptible to root nematodes.

The non-astringent persimmon is squat like a tomato and is most commonly sold as fuyu. Non-astringent persimmons are not actually free of tannins as the term suggests but rather are far less astringent before ripening and lose more of their tannic quality sooner. Non-astringent persimmons may be consumed when still very firm and remain edible when very soft.

There is a third type, less commonly available, the pollination-variant non-astringent persimmons. When fully pollinated, the flesh of these fruit is brown inside—known as goma in Japan—and the fruit can be eaten when firm. These varieties are highly sought after. Tsurunoko, sold as "chocolate persimmon" for its dark brown flesh, Maru, sold as "cinnamon persimmon" for its spicy flavor, and Hyakume, sold as "brown sugar", are the three best known.

Before ripening, persimmons usually have astringent or bitter taste.

Diospyros lotus (date-plum)
Date-plum (Diospyros lotus), also known as lotus persimmon, is native to southwest Asia and southeast Europe. Its English name probably derives from Persian Khormaloo خرمالو literally "date-plum", referring to the taste of this fruit, which is reminiscent of both plums and dates.

Diospyros virginiana (American persimmon)
American persimmon (Diospyros virginiana) is native to the eastern United States. Harvested in the fall or after the first frost, its fruit is eaten fresh, in baked goods, in steamed puddings, and to make a mildly alcoholic beverage called persimmon beer.

Varieties
 Prok
 Killen
 Claypool
 I-115
 Dollywood
 100-42
 100-43
 100-45
 Early Golden
 John Rick
 C-100
 JF-I

Diospyros discolor (velvet persimmon)
The Mabolo or velvet-apple (Diospyros discolor) is native to Taiwan, the Philippines and Borneo, and may be the same species as Diospyros blancoi.

Diospyros texana (Texas persimmon)
Texas persimmon (Diospyros texana) is native to central and west Texas and southwest Oklahoma in the United States, and eastern Chihuahua, Coahuila, Nuevo León, and Tamaulipas in northeastern Mexico. The fruit of D. texana are black, subglobose berries with a diameter of  that ripen in August.
The fleshy berries become edible when they turn dark purple or black, at which point they are sweet and can be eaten from the hand or made into pudding or custard.

Etymology 

The word persimmon is derived from putchamin, pasiminan, pechimin or pessamin, from Powhatan, an Algonquian language of the southern and eastern United States, meaning "a dry fruit". It was first used in English in the early 17th century.

Cultivation

In 2019, world production of persimmons was 4.27 million tonnes (4.7 million short tons), led by China with 75% of the total (table).

In China the Taiqiu persimmon variety yields approximately 30 metric tons of fruit a year at full production.

In Australia and other markets persimmons are graded by how many will fit in a standard 4kg tray leading, e.g. 12 or 28.

Australia
The persimmon was introduced to Australia by Chinese immigrants in the 1850s. Only astringent varieties were cultivated until the introduction of non-astringent varieties from Japan in the 1970s. In 2022 the vast majority of persimmons sold domestically in Australia were non astringent varieties.

Azerbaijan 
Persimmons are one of Azerbaijan's most important non-petroleum exports. The main export markets are Russia, Ukraine, Belarus, Kazakhstan and the United Arab Emirates.

Spain
The primary variety produced in Spain is the Rojo Brillante. Spain produces 400,000 tons of Rojo Brillante a year.

In the Valencia region of Spain, there is a variegated form of kaki called the "Ribera del Xuquer", "Spanish " (with one "m", is a trademark), or "Rojo Brillante" ("bright red").

Israel
The primary variety produced in Israel is the Sharon fruit. Israel produces  of Sharon fruit a year.

"Sharon fruit" (named after the Sharon plain in Israel) is the marketing name for the Israeli-bred cultivar 'Triumph'. As with most commercial pollination-variant-astringent persimmons, the fruit are ripened off the tree by exposing them to carbon dioxide. The "sharon fruit" has no core, is seedless and particularly sweet, and can be eaten whole.

United States
California produces  of Fuyu a year. Most persimmons produced in California are seedless. California and Florida account for most commercial production. The first commercial orchards in Florida were planted in the 1870s and production peaked in the 1990s before declining.

India
Japani phal is local name of Persimmon fruit in India. Persimmons can be grown in subtropical and temperate regions of the world. When it comes to Indian scenario, they are grown in Jammu & Kashmir, Himachal Pradesh, Tamil Nadu, Uttarakhand, Sikkim, Darjeeling Region of West Bengal & Arunachal Pradesh.

Toxicity
Unripe persimmons contain the soluble tannin shibuol, which, upon contact with a weak acid, polymerizes in the stomach and forms a gluey coagulum, a "foodball" or phytobezoar, that can affix with other stomach matter. These phytobezoars are often very hard and almost woody in consistency. More than 85% of phytobezoars are caused by ingestion of unripened persimmons. Persimmon bezoars (diospyrobezoars) often occur in epidemics in regions where the fruit is grown.

Uses

Persimmons are eaten fresh, dried, raw or cooked. When eaten fresh, they are usually eaten whole like an apple in bite-size slices and may be peeled, although the skin is edible. One way to consume ripe persimmons, which may have soft texture, is to remove the top leaf with a paring knife and scoop out the flesh with a spoon. Riper persimmons can also be eaten by removing the top leaf, breaking the fruit in half, and eating from the inside out. The flesh ranges from firm to mushy, and, when firm owing to being unripe, has an apple-like crunch. Some varieties are completely inedible until they are fully ripe, such as American persimmons (Diospyros virginiana) and Diospyros digyna. The leaves can be used to make tea and the seeds can be roasted.

In Korea, dried persimmon fruits are used to make the traditional Korean spicy punch sujeonggwa, while the matured, fermented fruit is used to make a persimmon vinegar called gamsikcho.

In Taiwan, fruits of astringent varieties are sealed in jars filled with limewater to get rid of bitterness. Slightly hardened in the process, they are sold under the name "crisp persimmon" (cuishi) or "water persimmon" (shuishizi).

For centuries, Japanese have consumed persimmon leaf tea (Kaki-No-Ha Cha) made from the dried leaves of "kaki" persimmons (Diospyros kaki).  In some areas of Manchuria and Korea, the dried leaves of the fruit are used for making tea. The Korean name for this tea is gamnip cha.

In the US from Ohio southward, persimmons are harvested and used in a variety of dessert dishes, most notably pies. They can be used in cookies, cakes, puddings, salads, curries and as a topping for breakfast cereal. Persimmon pudding is a baked dessert made with fresh persimmons that has the consistency of pumpkin pie but resembles a brownie and is almost always topped with whipped cream. An annual persimmon festival, featuring a persimmon pudding contest, is held every September in Mitchell, Indiana.

Persimmons may be stored at room temperature  where they will continue to ripen. In northern China, unripe persimmons are frozen outside during winter to speed up the ripening process.

It is recommended that persimmons be stored stem end down and that refrigeration at home should be avoided in order to prevent the fruit going mushy.

Persimmons can also be fermented in the manner of black garlic.

Dried

In China, Korea, Japan and Vietnam, persimmons after harvesting are prepared using traditional hand-drying techniques outdoors for two to three weeks. The fruit is then further dried by exposure to heat over several days before being shipped to market, to be sold as dried fruit. In Japan, the dried persimmon fruit is called hoshigaki, in China shìbǐng 柿饼, in Korea gotgam, and in Vietnam hồng khô. It is eaten as a snack or dessert and used for other culinary purposes.

Nutrition 
Persimmons have higher levels of dietary fiber and some dietary minerals than apples, but overall are not a significant source of micronutrients, except for manganese (17% of the Daily Value, DV) and provitamin A beta-carotene (10% DV, table for raw Japanese persimmons per 100-gram amount). Raw American persimmons are a rich source of vitamin C (80% DV per 100g) and iron (19% DV).

Culture
In Ozark folklore, the severity of the upcoming winter is said to be predictable by slicing a persimmon seed and seeing whether it is shaped like a knife, fork, or spoon within. According to Missouri Department of Conservation, this is not a reliable method.

In Korean folklore the dried persimmon (gotgam, Korean: 곶감) has a reputation for scaring away tigers.

In Malaysia and Singapore. large persimmons are viewed as a status symbol.

Problems
In 1999, the first report of leaf blight on sweet persimmon tree by fungal pathogen Pestalotiopsis theae in Spain was documented.

References

External links

 

+
Fruits originating in Asia
Medicinal plants
Edible fruits

de:Kaki
it:Diospyros kaki
ja:カキノキ#柿の実